Katie Lorna Thistleton (born 13 May 1989) is an English television and radio presenter, National Council for the Training of Journalists (NCTJ) qualified journalist and author, best known for her work across the CBBC channel. She presents Life Hacks and The Official Chart: First Look on BBC Radio 1 alongside Vick Hope.

Early life
Born in Manchester, Thistleton attended Droylsden High School for Girls. Thistleton graduated from the University of Salford with a degree in English and Creative Writing along with fellow star Lauren Layfield, before qualifying as a NCTJ certified journalist after studying at News Associates, Manchester.

Thistleton previously worked for the NHS Pennine Care mental health trust.

Career

Television

Thistleton is best known for her work presenting in CBBC HQ, hosting the live 'bits in between the shows'. She has done this since she was headhunted for the job in 2013 whilst working behind the scenes for CBBC as a PA and Researcher.

She hosts the CBBC Book Club on the CBBC channel.  The Book Club role has seen Thistleton interviewing many leading authors, including David Baddiel, Debbie McGee, Cressida Cowell, Jeff Kinney, Michael Rosen, Holly Smale, and Jacqueline Wilson.

Thistleton has also appeared on a variety of CBBC shows, including All Over the Place, Blue Peter, Jedward's Big Adventure, The Dog Ate My Homework, and Sam & Mark's Big Friday Wind-Up. In March 2019, Katie Thistleton announced she would be leaving CBBC to focus on new projects. Her last day was on 29 March.

Away from children's television, Thistleton has also appeared on Celebrity Eggheads, Celebrity Mastermind, and Children in Need.

Literary roles
In addition to her televised literary work, Thistleton also hosts author events organised by publishing houses, including Hachette, HarperCollins, and Penguin.

Thistleton is a regular at literary festivals, including the Edinburgh Literary Festival and Hay Festival.  She has also judged The Blue Peter Book Awards and The Royal Society Young People's Book Prize.

Mental-health ambassador
Thistleton raises mental health awareness.  She is an ambassador for mental health charities Young Minds and Place2Be.

Radio
From May to December 2017, Thistleton hosted BBC Radio 1's The Surgery alongside Radha Modgil.

Thistleton currently hosts Life Hacks and The Official Chart: First Look on Radio 1 alongside Vick Hope.

Thistleton regularly co-hosts Going Home with Vick and Jordan on BBC Radio 1 when either Hope or Jordan North is absent with the remaining half of the duo.

Book
Thistleton's debut book — Dear Katie: Real Problems, Real Advice — was published by the Orion Publishing Group in February 2018.

References

External links
Radio 1's Life Hacks - Adapt the World (BBC Radio 1)
Radio 1 Anthems (BBC Radio 1)
Katie Thistleton (BBC Radio 1)
Radio 1's Life Hacks (BBC Radio 1)
The Official Chart: First Look on Radio 1 (BBC Radio 1)

1989 births
Living people
BBC Radio 1 presenters
Alumni of the University of Salford
English television presenters
English radio presenters
English journalists
21st-century English writers
Writers from Manchester